Alaniz is a surname originating in Spain. Notable people with the surname include:

Lourdes Alaniz, Mexican artist
Martín Alaniz (born 1993), Uruguayan footballer
Maximiliano Alaníz (born 1990), Argentine footballer
Ricardo Alaníz Posada (born 1937), Mexican businessman and politician
Rico Alaniz (1919–2015), Mexican-born American actor
Ruben Alaniz (born 1991), American baseball player